Cephetola nigra, the Bethune-Baker's epitola, is a butterfly in the family Lycaenidae. It is found in Sierra Leone, Ivory Coast, Nigeria (the Cross River loop), Cameroon, the Democratic Republic of the Congo and Uganda. Its habitat consists of forests.

References

Butterflies described in 1903
Poritiinae
Taxa named by George Thomas Bethune-Baker
Butterflies of Africa